Bar Rud (also Romanized as Bar Rūd; also known as Varrūd) is a village in Sarjam Rural District, Ahmadabad District, Mashhad County, Razavi Khorasan Province, Iran. At the 2006 census, its population was 130, in 32 families.

See also 

 List of cities, towns and villages in Razavi Khorasan Province

References 

Populated places in Mashhad County